Orophodon is an extinct genus of ground sloth of the family Mylodontidae, endemic to Argentina, South America.

Taxonomy 
Orophodon was named by Florentino Ameghino in 1894. It was assigned to Mylodontidae by Carroll in 1988.

References

Further reading 
 F. Ameghino. 1894. Sur les oiseaux fossiles de Patagonie; et la faune mammalogique des couches à Pyrotherium. Boletin del Instituto Geographico Argentino 15:501-660

Prehistoric sloths
Oligocene xenarthrans
Oligocene mammals of South America
Deseadan
Neogene Argentina
Fossils of Argentina
Fossil taxa described in 1894
Taxa named by Florentino Ameghino